Thirudiya Idhayathai is a 2005 Indian Tamil-language romantic action film written and directed by Murali Krishna. It stars producer Rohan Salian, Kunal and Shubha Poonja. The score and soundtrack for the film was by director Bharani. The film's title is based on a song from Paarvai Ondre Pothume, also starring Kunal.

Cast 
Rohan Salian as Arun
Kunal as Ganesh
 Shubha Poonja as Haritha
Brinda Parekh
Ramji as Victor
Nizhalgal Ravi
Ganja Karuppu
Fathima Babu
Seshu

Production
Rohan Salian, who had been best known for being the boyfriend of actress Sherin in the early 2000s, announced that he would produce and act in the film. Kunal was cast as another lead, marking his third collaboration with Murali Krishna after Paarvai Ondre Podhume (2001) and Pesadha Kannum Pesume (2002). Shubha Poonja worked on the film alongside her commitments for Machi (2004) opposite Dushyanth and the unreleased Shanmugha opposite Richard. Satisfied with her work in the film, Rohan signed Shubha to also work on his next film, while buying her a diamond ring.

It was initially reported that actor Karthik would make a guest appearance in the film, but he later did not feature. The entire film was shot within seventeen days. The shoot of the film was completed by September 2004, with a press meet held at Quality Inn Aruna in Chennai to mark the end of the shoot.

Soundtrack
Soundtrack was composed by Bharani and lyrics written by Pa. Vijay and Murali Krishna (Onnu Rendu).
Ithanai Nalaai - Harish Raghavendra
Onnu Rendu - Murali Krishna
Podhathu Podhathu - Krishnaraj, Srimathumitha
Konjum - Kalpana, P. Unnikrishnan
Monalisa - Mahathi

Release and reception
S. R. Ashok Kumar of The Hindu opined that "Murali Krishna has wasted a good opportunity by doing a half-baked project. He should have worked more on the screenplay. Both dialogue and direction leave much to be desired". A critic from the entertainment portal ChennaiOnline.com noted, "there's nothing fresh or exciting here in script or narration", adding that Rohan has  a "long way to go by way of emoting". Another reviewer noted that the film was "old wine in an old bottle".

The film did not perform well commercially. Rohan attempted to make comebacks through films such as Prabha's Century Raagam opposite Diya, and Murali Krishna's Chozha with Shubha Poonja, but neither film eventually released.

Rohan spoke out against Murali Krishna, suggesting the director cheated him "out of several lakhs of rupees but also has come up with a movie which was miserable and painful to watch". Actress Sherin later spoke out against her ex-boyfriend Rohan in December 2006, stating that she had lent him over 60 lakh rupees to make the film, and that he had cheated her.

References 

2005 films
2000s Tamil-language films
Indian romantic drama films
Indian romantic action films
2000s romantic action films
2005 romantic drama films